Eduardo Teixeira Coelho (January 4, 1919 in Angra do Heroísmo – May 31, 2005) was a Portuguese comic book artist best known for his adventure series Ragnar le Viking. In some of his early work he used the pseudonym Martin Sievre. 

Born in Terceira island, in the Azores, Coelho's career began, when he moved to the Mainland Portugal. His most notable work there was for the magazine Mosquito, beginning in 1943. He moved to Brazil in the 1950s and taught at the Pan-American School of Art in São Paulo. In 1955 he moved to France and for the next several decades worked on a number of series, many of them for the magazine Vaillant, including Ragnar.  

Coelho died in Florence, aged 86, where he had lived for several years.

External links
Lambiek Comiclopedia entry
Coelho fan page 
BDzoom obituary 

1919 births
2005 deaths
Portuguese comics artists
People from Angra do Heroísmo